Greatest Hits is a remix album by the electronic band Electric Company. It was released in 2001 on Tigerbeat6.

Track listing

Personnel 
Brad Laner – instruments, production
Steve Miller – photography

References 

2001 remix albums
Electric Company (band) albums
Tigerbeat6 albums